NPSS may refer to:

 IEEE Nuclear and Plasma Sciences Society, a transnational group of about 3000 professional engineers and scientists
 Norman Park State School, a co-educational, state primary school in Norman Park, Queensland, Australia
 North Park Secondary School, a high school located in Brampton, Ontario, Canada
 Nottawasaga Pines Secondary School, a high school located in Angus, Ontario, Canada
 National Public Safety Solutions, a company located in Austin, Texas, United States
 Numerical Propulsion System Simulation, software usually used to analyze gas turbine engines